John Hunt Painter (September 3, 1819 – April 9, 1891) was a Quaker farmer living near Springdale, Iowa, who sent the firearms to abolitionist John Brown that were used during Brown's historic raid on Harpers Ferry in 1859. John Hunt Painter was an early settler of Pasadena, California where, in 1888, he erected the La Pintoresca ("The Picturesque") hotel, a local landmark. In 1889 he was a pallbearer at the Pasadena funeral of Owen Brown, whom he knew from Iowa.

In 1849, John Hunt Painter moved to his farm near Springdale, a small Quaker community in Cedar County, Iowa.

References and notes

References
Aurner, Clarence Ray (editor) (1910). A topical history of Cedar County, Iowa. Chicago: S. J. Clarke Publishing Co., Volume I.
Hunt, Charles Cummins (1906). A genealogical history of the Robert and Abigail Pancoast Hunt family. Columbus, Ohio: Champlin Press.
Jones, Louis Thomas (1914). The Quakers of Iowa. Iowa City: The State Historical Society of Iowa.
Reid, Hiram Alvin (1895). History of Pasadena. Pasadena: Pasadena History Co., Publishers.
Wood, J. W. (1917). Pasadena, California. Published by the author.

External links
"Early Views of Pasadena"
Find a Grave memorial for John Hunt Painter
Find a Grave memorial  for Edith (Dean) Painter
Owen Brown at Pasadena, California

1819 births
1891 deaths
American Quakers
John Brown (abolitionist)
People from Cedar County, Iowa